This is a list of some of the cattle breeds considered in Switzerland to be wholly or partly of Swiss origin. Some may have complex or obscure histories, so inclusion here does not necessarily imply that a breed is predominantly or exclusively Swiss.

 Braunvieh
 Hérens
 Évolène
 Fribourgeoise (extinct)
 Original Schweizer Braunvieh
 Original Simmental
 Rätisches Grauvieh
 Swiss Fleckvieh

See also
List of Swiss goat breeds
Agriculture in Switzerland
Swiss cheeses and dairy products

References

 
Cattle